Fludyer is a surname. Notable people with the surname include:

George Fludyer, MP for Chippenham and Appleby
Fludyer baronets
Samuel Fludyer (disambiguation), multiple people